Rural economics is the study of rural economies. Rural economies  include both agricultural and non-agricultural industries, so rural economics has broader concerns than agricultural economics which focus more on food systems. Rural development and finance attempt to solve larger challenges within rural economics. These economic issues are often connected to the migration from rural areas due to lack of economic activities and rural poverty. Some interventions have been very successful in some parts of the world, with rural electrification and rural tourism providing anchors for transforming economies in some rural areas.  These challenges often create rural-urban income disparities.

Rural spaces add new challenges for economic analysis that require an understanding of economic geography: for example understanding of size and spatial distribution of production and household units and interregional trade, land use, and how low population density effects  government policies as to development, investment, regulation, and transportation.

Issues

Rural development

Electrification

Rural flight

Rural poverty

Important sectors

Agriculture

Peasantry

Tourism

See also

 Agricultural economics
 Agroecology
 Economic development
 Economic geography
 Electrical energy efficiency on United States farms
 Regional economics 
 RIGA Project
 Rural development
 Rural sociology
 Urban economics

References 

 Thomas Nixon Carver (1911). Principles of Rural Economics. Chapter links, pp. vii-x.
 _, ed. (1926). Selected Readings in Rural Economics, Chapter links, pp. vii-x.
 John Ise (1920). "What is Rural Economics," Quarterly Journal of Economics, 34(2), pp.   300-312.
 Yves Léon (2005). "Rural Development in Europe: A Research Frontier for Agricultural Economists," European Review of Agricultural Economics, 32(3), pp. 301–317. Abstract.
 Ida J. Terluin and Jaap H. Post, ed. (2001). Employment Dynamics in Rural Europe. Chapter previews.